Crater was an unincorporated community in Inyo County, California.

Human activity at the site was primarily concerned with production of sulfur, which was discovered in 1917. Sulfur mining and ore milling operations occurred at Crater intermittently from 1917 through the late 1960s. The site is a privately owned inholding surrounded by Death Valley National Park.

External links
 Description of Sulfur mining operations at Crater

References

Populated places in the Mojave Desert
Death Valley
Unincorporated communities in California
Unincorporated communities in Inyo County, California